In 1967, the United States FBI, under Director J. Edgar Hoover, continued for an eighteenth year to maintain a public list of the people it regarded as the Ten Most Wanted Fugitives.

As the FBI began the year 1967, all ten places on the list remained filled by fugitives from prior years, then still at large:

 1962 #170 (five years), Edward Howard Maps process dismissed December 1, 1967
 1964 #193 (three years), Chester Collins process dismissed March 30, 1967
 1964 #197 (three years), Alson Thomas Wahrlich arrested October 28, 1967
 1965 #203 (two years), John William Clouser remained still at large
 1966 #226 (one year), Robert Van Lewing arrested February 6, 1967
 1966 #235 (one year), Lynwood Irwin Mears arrested May 2, 1967
 1966 #236 (one year), James Robert Ringrose apprehended March 29, 1967
 1966 #239 (one year), George Ben Edmonson arrested June 28, 1967
 1966 #241 (two months), Gene Robert Jennings arrested February 14, 1967
 1966 #242 (four months), Clarence Wilbert McFarland arrested April 4, 1967

By year end, the FBI had cleared through all but one of the fugitives who opened 1967 on the list. Coupled with quick capture of fugitives added during the year, the FBI added a total of 18 new fugitives during 1967.

1967 also brought another pair of brothers to the list, Charles and Gordon Ervin.

1967 fugitives
The "Ten Most Wanted Fugitives" listed by the FBI in 1967 include (in FBI list appearance sequence order):

Monroe Hickson
February 17, 1967 #243
One year on the list
Monroe Hickson - declared deceased by January 30, 1968 in Chapel Hill, North Carolina when a couple recognized his photograph in a "Top Ten" display and identified him as a migrant worker who had died of natural causes. Positive identification was made by fingerprints.

Clyde Edward Laws
February 28, 1967 #244
Three months on the list
Clyde Edward Laws - U.S. prisoner arrested May 18, 1967 in Raytown, Missouri through cooperation of a relative.

Charles Edward Ervin
April 13, 1967 #245
Three months on the list
Charles Edward Ervin - Canada prisoner arrested July 25, 1967 in Hawkesbury, Ontario, Canada by the Royal Canadian Mounted Police. He sported facial scars indicative of plastic surgery; was the brother of and listed with Fugitive #246, Gordon Dale Ervin

Gordon Dale Ervin
April 13, 1967 #246
Two years on the list
Gordon Dale Ervin - Canada prisoner arrested June 7, 1969 in Winnipeg, Manitoba, Canada by the Royal Canadian Mounted Police
nearly two years after his brother (Fugitive #245).

Thomas Franklin Dorman
April 20, 1967 #247
One month on the list
Thomas Franklin Dorman - U.S. prisoner arrested May 20, 1967 in Grantsburg, Indiana by the FBI aided by local and state
police.

Joseph Leroy Newman
June 2, 1967 #249
One month on the list
Joseph Leroy Newman - U.S. prisoner arrested June 29, 1967 in Jersey City, New Jersey.

Carmen Raymond Gagliardi

June 9, 1967 #250

One year on the list

Carmen Raymond Gagliardi - U.S. prisoner arrested December 23, 1968 in Medford, Massachusetts in his mother's home.

Donald Richard Bussmeyer
June 28, 1967 #251
Two months on the list
Donald Richard Bussmeyer - U.S. prisoner arrested August 24, 1967 in Upland, California clad only in shorts. A tattoo on his chest "Don Bussmeyer Loves Joyce" gave away his identity. With two accomplices he had robbed $75,000 from a Los Angeles bank.

Florencio Lopez Mationg
July 1, 1967 #252
Two weeks on the list
Florencio Lopez Mationg - U.S. prisoner arrested July 16, 1967 in Los Angeles, California with his partner Victor Bono (Fugitive #253).

Victor Jerald Bono
July 1, 1967 #253
Two weeks on the list
Victor Jerald Bono - U.S. prisoner arrested July 16, 1967 in Los Angeles, California with his partner Florencio Lopez Mationg (Fugitive #252).

Alfred Johnson Cooper, Jr.
July 27, 1967 #254
Two months on the list
Alfred Johnson Cooper, Jr. - U.S. prisoner arrested September 8, 1967 in Boston, Massachusetts. A visitor on the FBI Tour in Washington, D. C. recognized Cooper's photograph on the "Top Ten" display.

John D. Slaton
August 2, 1967 #255
Four months on the list
John D. Slaton - U.S. prisoner arrested December 1, 1967 in Harquahala Valley, Arizona.

Jerry Ray James
August 16, 1967 #256
Five months on the list
Jerry Ray James - U.S. prisoner arrested January 24, 1968 in Tucson, Arizona by FBI Agents and local police, along with his partner Donald Sparks (Fugitive #259).

Richard Paul Anderson
September 7, 1967 #257
Four months on the list
Richard Paul Anderson - Canada prisoner arrested January 19, 1968 in Toronto, Ontario, Canada by Canadian Police

Henry Theodore Young
September 21, 1967 #258
Four months on the list
Henry Theodore Young - U.S. prisoner arrested January 9, 1968 in Kansas City, Missouri after a citizen recognized him
from an article in Inside Detective magazine.

Donald Eugene Sparks
August 3, 1967 #259, was evidently listed late after his approval to the list
Five months on the list
Donald Eugene Sparks - U.S. prisoner arrested January 24, 1968 in Tucson, Arizona by FBI Agents and local police, along with his partner Jerry James (Fugitive #256).

Zelma Lavone King
December 14, 1967 #260
Zelma Lavone King - U.S. prisoner arrested January 30, 1968 in Phoenix, Arizona.

Jerry Reece Peacock
December 14, 1967 #261
Three months on the list
Jerry Reece Peacock - U.S. prisoner arrested March 5, 1968 in Mesquite, Nevada.

See also

Later entries
FBI Ten Most Wanted Fugitives, 2020s
FBI Ten Most Wanted Fugitives, 2010s
FBI Ten Most Wanted Fugitives, 2000s
FBI Ten Most Wanted Fugitives, 1990s
FBI Ten Most Wanted Fugitives, 1980s
FBI Ten Most Wanted Fugitives, 1970s
FBI Ten Most Wanted Fugitives, 1960s

Prior entries
FBI Ten Most Wanted Fugitives, 1950s

References

External links
Current FBI top ten most wanted fugitives at FBI site
FBI pdf source document listing all Ten Most Wanted year by year (removed by FBI)

1967 in the United States